The nesting season is the time of year during which birds and some other animals, particularly some reptiles, build nests, lay eggs in them, and in most cases bring up their young. It is usually in the spring.

Bird conservation often advises measures to avoid disturbing birds in their nesting season.

Bird breeding